John Patrick Ryan, Sr.  (Hon.) is a fictional character created by author Tom Clancy and featured in his Ryanverse novels, which have consistently topped the New York Times bestseller list over 30 years. Since Clancy's death in 2013, four other authors, Mark Greaney, Grant Blackwood, Mike Maden, and Marc Cameron, have continued writing new novels for the franchise and its other connecting series with the approval of the Clancy family estate.

The son of a Baltimore police detective and a nurse, Ryan is a former U.S. Marine and stockbroker who becomes a civilian history professor at the United States Naval Academy (USNA). Ryan joins the Central Intelligence Agency (CIA) as an analyst and occasional field officer, eventually leaving it as Deputy Director. After retiring from the CIA, Ryan later served as National Security Advisor and Vice President before suddenly becoming President of the United States following a terrorist attack on the United States Capitol. Ryan went on to serve two non-consecutive terms and mostly dealt with international crises in Europe, the Middle East, Africa, and Asia.

Jack Ryan has been portrayed in film adaptations by actors Alec Baldwin, Harrison Ford, Ben Affleck, and Chris Pine. The Jack Ryan film series from 1990 to 2014 have an unadjusted worldwide gross revenue of $788.4 million to date, making it the 57th-highest-grossing film series. John Krasinski is the fifth and latest actor to portray Ryan in the Amazon Prime web series of the same name, which was first broadcast in 2018.

Fictional biography

Early life
Ryan was born in 1950 to an Irish Catholic family in Baltimore, Maryland. His father, Emmet William Ryan, was a Baltimore Police Department homicide lieutenant and World War II veteran. The elder Ryan had served with Easy Company, 506th Infantry Regiment, 101st Airborne Division at the Battle of the Bulge. His mother, Catherine Burke Ryan, was a nurse. Patriot Games mentioned that he had a sister, who lived in Seattle. Without Remorse mentioned that his sister is younger than he, and that he wanted to join the Marines to get a scholarship so the family would have more money for her education. After graduating from Loyola High School, a Roman Catholic Jesuit prep school in Towson, Maryland in suburban Baltimore County, Ryan attended Boston College, graduating with a Bachelor of Arts degree in economics (with a strong minor in history) and was a rower. He commissioned as a second lieutenant in the United States Marine Corps via the USMC Officer Candidates School. While waiting for the Corps to assign him, he passed the Certified Public Accountant exam.

After officer training at Marine Corps Base Quantico in Quantico, Virginia, Ryan went on to serve briefly as a Marine infantry platoon leader. However, his military career was cut short at the age of 23 when his platoon's helicopter, a CH-46 Sea Knight, crashed during a NATO exercise over the Greek island of Crete. The crash badly injured Ryan's back. Surgeons at the National Naval Medical Center in Bethesda, Maryland inadequately repaired his back. This led to a lengthy recovery process (during which he became addicted to pain medications) after which, complete with a permanent disability and wearing a back brace, he left the Marines. He passed his stockbroker's exam and took a position with Wall Street investment firm Merrill Lynch's Baltimore office.

Ryan's parents died in a plane crash at Chicago Midway International Airport 19 months after his crash in Crete. He developed a fear of flying that persisted for years.

The film version of The Hunt for Red October changed Ryan's educational background to being a 1972 graduate of the United States Naval Academy. As Red October is sailing into the Penobscot River in Maine, Ryan says he grew up in that area. In the film it is also said the helicopter crash happened in his third year at the Academy and he finished his senior year from his hospital bed. The film version of Patriot Games also implies that he is a graduate of Annapolis by briefly showing a certificate on the wall of their home. In the Amazon Prime television series, Jack Ryan, Ryan's Ph.D. is in economics rather than history.

Civilian career
While managing clients' portfolios, Ryan began to invest his own money, banking on a tip he had received from an uncle about the workers' takeover of the Chicago and North Western Railway, making about $6 million off his $100,000 initial investment. He did so well that one of Merrill Lynch's senior vice presidents, Joe Muller, came to Baltimore to have dinner with him, with the objective of inviting him to the firm's New York City headquarters near Wall Street. Also present is Muller's daughter Caroline, nicknamed Cathy, then a senior medical student at The Johns Hopkins University School of Medicine. They immediately fall in love and get engaged.

One night, while having dinner with his fiancée, Ryan throws out his back. Cathy takes him directly to Dr. Stanley Rabinowitz, professor of neurosurgery at famed Johns Hopkins Hospital in Baltimore, to be evaluated. Rabinowitz later operates on Ryan's back and cures his chronic pain in relatively short order. (In a later novel, the surgeon is credited as Sam Rosen, a doctor introduced in Without Remorse.) Ryan subsequently persuades the government to terminate his disability checks. Cathy later becomes an ophthalmic surgeon at the Wilmer Eye Institute of the Johns Hopkins University School of Medicine and a professor of surgery at Johns Hopkins.

After creating a net worth of $8 million, Ryan left the firm after four years and enrolled at Georgetown University in Washington, D.C. for six doctoral courses in history. He does a brief stint at the Center for Strategic and International Studies, then accepts a position at the U.S. Naval Academy as a civilian professor of history. In addition, he has also written books on naval history: Options and Decisions, Doomed Eagles, and Fighting Sailor, a biography of World War II Admiral William "Bull" Halsey, in which he justifies Halsey's actions during the Battle of Leyte Gulf.

First CIA work and career
Following a recommendation from Father Tim O'Riley, a Jesuit priest and professor at Georgetown University in Washington, D.C., to a Central Intelligence Agency contact, Ryan was asked to work as a consultant for the agency, although officially employed by the MITRE Corporation. He agreed and spent several months at agency headquarters in Langley, Virginia, where he wrote a paper entitled "Agents and Agencies", in which he maintained that state-sponsored terrorism is an act of war. He also invented the canary trap, a method for exposing an information leak, which involves giving different versions of a sensitive document to each of a group of suspects and seeing which version is leaked. By ensuring that each copy of the document differs slightly in its wording, if any copy is leaked, then it is possible to determine the informant's identity.

These accomplishments come to the attention of U.S. Navy Vice Admiral James Greer, the CIA's Deputy Director for Intelligence. The expertise of Ryan's report, plus the application, persuaded Greer to offer him a permanent job in the CIA, but Ryan declined.

Patriot Games (1987)

While in London with his family, Ryan (portrayed  by Harrison Ford in the film) stumbles upon a kidnapping attempt on the Prince of Wales and his family (in the movie: Sir Holmes, a cousin of the Queen), which is orchestrated by Irish terrorist group Ulster Liberation Army. He foils the attack by killing one gunman while injuring another and gets wounded in the process. Ryan is later knighted by Queen Elizabeth II as an honorary Knight Commander of the Royal Victorian Order; in the books, some British characters call him "Sir John" even though honorary knights are not permitted to use the style of "Sir".

Sean Miller, the Irish gunman Ryan wounded, was sentenced to life imprisonment but is freed by his ULA compatriots, embittered over the failure of the kidnapping attempt, and particularly the death of his brother at Ryan's hands in that attempt, he exacts revenge on Ryan by attacking his wife and daughter. After pleas by Greer, Ryan agrees to join the CIA in a permanent position as an analyst, originally to gather intelligence on the ULA. Later, Miller and his men stage another kidnapping attempt on the Prince and Princess of Wales, who are visiting the Ryan family in their Maryland home; however, they are overpowered by the combined efforts of Ryan, his friend Robert "Robby" Jackson, and the Prince as well as law enforcement and naval officers who are nearby. After the ordeal, Ryan's second child Jack Ryan Jr. was born.

Red Rabbit (2002)
Ryan's first CIA assignment is to London as a member of a liaison group to the British Secret Intelligence Service. Initially called in to assess the Soviet government and economy, Ryan is later tasked to assist in the defection of a KGB communications officer who has discovered that his boss Yuri Andropov had ordered Pope John Paul II's assassination. Although Ryan and a small team of British SIS agents helps the "Rabbit" and his family get to the West, they fail to prevent the attack on the Pope (which actually happened in real life in 1981). Nevertheless, the pope is only wounded and his would-be assassin captured, while the British execute his Bulgarian handler. "Rabbit's" defection proves to be a major coup for both the American and British intelligence agencies. Ryan soon afterward suggests a nonmilitary long-term strategy to help hasten the Soviet Union's collapse and the end of the Cold War.

The Hunt for Red October (1984)
Captain First Rank Marko Ramius, the Soviet Navy's top submarine commander, takes command of the Красный Октябрь (Krasny Oktyabr, or in English, Red October), the newest Typhoon-class ballistic missile submarine, with which he plans to defect with his officers. Having briefly met Captain Ramius at an embassy function several years before, Ryan (portrayed by Alec Baldwin in the film) is asked by Admiral Greer to brief the President's National Security Adviser Jeffrey Pelt and his staff, in his first trip to the White House, on Ramius' background and the deadly new capabilities of Red October secret revolutionary silent jet propulsion drive system. Ryan recognizes that the renegade ethnic Lithuanian captain may want to defect rather than attack the West.  Ryan works to establish contact with him and support contingency efforts of the tailing American submarine USS Dallas. Ryan seeks to get Ramius and members of his crew along with the submarine secretly into the U.S., eventually succeeding.The Cardinal of the Kremlin (1988)
Ryan is reassigned to the CIA headquarters at Langley and becomes Admiral Greer's special assistant. He is sent to Moscow as part of the American nuclear weapons reduction (START) team, and later engineers the extraction of CARDINAL, CIA's highest agent-in-place, from the country. Along the way, he also forces KGB chairman Nikolay Gerasimov to defect due to his anti-American nature, which could jeopardize the arms reduction talks once he becomes General Secretary. His plan involves a disinformation campaign that shows himself under SEC investigation for insider trading, which provides an opening for Gerasimov to help Ryan defect to the Soviet Union and work for the KGB.

Clear and Present Danger (1989)
Ryan (portrayed by Harrison Ford in the film) is promoted to acting DDI when Greer is hospitalized with cancer. Despite this, he is not made aware of a highly covert and illegal CIA operation encouraged by the president claiming domestic drug abuse was a "clear and present danger" to American security, and approved by corrupt National Security Advisor Admiral Cutter. This operation targets Colombian drug lords in South America using light infantry troops of Hispanic descent and occasional precision air strikes with sophisticated "smartbombs", in what is usually considered a law enforcement area. Ryan works with the Federal Bureau of Investigation (FBI) to rescue a small group of American soldiers cut off in Colombia, forcing him to miss Greer's funeral. Also in this operation, he first met the U.S. government operative John Clark, with whom he would become friends. Around this time, Ryan also runs afoul of Elizabeth Elliot, international affairs advisor to then-presidential candidate Governor of Ohio J. Robert Fowler, and one of Cathy Ryan's former professors.

The Sum of All Fears (1990)
Ryan (portrayed by Ben Affleck in the film) reaches his highest post at the CIA, Deputy Director of Central Intelligence. His career is jeopardized when Fowler becomes President and Elizabeth Elliott, Fowler's lover/manipulator, becomes National Security Advisor. They not only deny Ryan any credit for an innovative Middle East peace plan (basically turning Jerusalem into a Vatican-like city co-ruled by three Christian, Jewish, and Arab/Muslim mayors), but also panic when Palestinian and former East German terrorists detonate a nuclear bomb in Denver during the Super Bowl and nearly plunge the world into a Soviet-American nuclear war. Ryan defuses the nuclear crisis by commandeering the Washington-Moscow hot line and convincing the Soviet Premier (through his friend Golovko) that the crisis is a setup. He then refuses to confirm Fowler's order to launch a nuclear missile at Qom (thus preventing the attack), where the Iranian ayatollah lives. The crisis and Elliot scandal drives Fowler to resign. On this note, Ryan retires from the CIA and flies to Riyadh in Saudi Arabia to witness the execution of the surviving terrorists, and is then honored by the U.S.'s Middle Eastern allies by being presented with the sword used to execute the terrorists.

The film again departs from the novel, by presenting a younger, unmarried Ryan, an intelligent mistress-free Fowler, a Greer-like Cabot, and the nuclear bomb is detonated over the city Baltimore instead of Denver. The film also changes the identity of the terrorists from Arabs to neo-Nazis.

Debt of Honor (1994)
After a brief stint as a stockbroker, Ryan returns to government service as the National Security Advisor, restoring honor to the job that Cutter and Elliot disgraced. It has been two and a half years since Fowler resigned and his vice president, Roger Durling, is now well into his own term. Jack and the administration must deal with a second war between the U.S. and Japan, as well as an attack on America's economic infrastructure. After a clean sweep of Japan's forces in the South Pacific, Vice President Ed Kealty is forced to resign after a sex scandal and President Durling taps Ryan for the job. Ryan accepts the job on the condition that he will only serve until the end of Durling's term, and sees this as a way of ending his public life. Only minutes after Congress confirms Ryan, though, a Japanese airline pilot deliberately crashes a 747 into the U.S. Capitol building during Congress's joint session, killing most of the people inside, decapitating the U.S. government, and elevating Ryan to the presidency.

First Ryan administration

Executive Orders (1996)
The reluctant yet determined Ryan administration emerges as Ryan slowly rebuilds the government. He is faced with Kealty's political trickery, as the former vice president disputes his legitimacy as the nation's chief executive by publicly stating that he never actually resigned, when in fact a member of his staff had secretly taken the resignation letter from the office of the now-dead Secretary of State and destroyed it. Initially the lone voice of opposition to Ryan's policies on live television, he later enlists disaffected CIA intelligence officials (affected by the reduction in force at the agency in favor of more field operatives) to procure classified information on Ryan from his time in the CIA. He then suborns NBC news anchor and fellow Ryan critic Tom Donner into ambushing him with questions about his CIA career in a televised interview. Donner later realizes his mistake and publicly apologizes to President Ryan, while Kealty's challenge eventually fails in court.

Along the way, Ryan also has to deal with the dictator of the new United Islamic Republic (a coalition of Iran and Iraq), the Ayatollah Mahmoud Haji Daryaei. The ayatollah regards him as a weakling and seizes the opportunity to stage a multi-pronged attack on the country: a biological attack using a weaponized strain of the Ebola virus, a kidnapping attempt on his youngest daughter Katie, and an assassination attempt on himself through an Iranian sleeper agent disguised as a Secret Service bodyguard; with the U.S. overwhelmed by a multitude of crises, he believes that he can invade Saudi Arabia with little military opposition from the U.S. While the attempt on Katie was swiftly averted by the FBI and the Secret Service, the Ebola epidemic causes Ryan to declare martial law and enforce a travel ban that becomes instrumental in killing the virus, since it cannot survive in the American environment due to its fragile nature. He later deploys what is left of the American military to assist Saudi and Kuwaiti forces in repelling the UIR military, which also becomes successful. The would-be assassin is later arrested on the spot by the FBI after attempting to kill President Ryan inside the Oval Office.

Ryan Doctrine
At the end of Executive Orders, Ryan, in the tradition of Presidents Monroe, Truman, Carter and Reagan, issues a foreign policy doctrine which largely defines his administration's international perspective. The Ryan Doctrine states that the U.S. will no longer tolerate attacks on "our territory, our possessions, or our citizens," and will hold whoever orders such attacks accountable.

This statement comes soon after the Ebola attack on the U.S. ordered by Daryaei. Ryan announces the new doctrine on television, momentarily cutting away to show Daryaei and his UIR advisors being incinerated by laser-guided bombs launched from two F-117s, on Ryan's orders. Therefore, the Ryan doctrine supersedes the executive order put in place by President Ford, which forbids the assassination of foreign heads of state. Ryan, however, believes it is a more ethical alternative than total war, since it punishes the person responsible for the attack instead of the people he rules.

Within the books, the Ryan doctrine is not officially invoked after Daryaei's death (although Ryan threatens to use it on the Chinese leadership in The Bear and the Dragon, should anything happen to American citizens living in China as a consequence of the Siberian War).

The Bear and the Dragon (2000)
Ryan has completed Durling's term as president and has campaigned for the next election, which he wins. He retains most of his emergency Cabinet and has Robby Jackson as vice president. He has to deal with the attempted assassination of Golovko, who is now head of Russia's Foreign Intelligence Service (formerly the KGB). This turns out to be an attempt to sow confusion in the Russian government because of China's designs to annex Eastern Siberia, where geologists had recently discovered a large amount of oil and gold. These events lead to the inclusion of Russia into NATO and the assistance of U.S. forces in the Sino-Russian conflict (although attacks on NATO members outside the Atlantic should not trigger Article V).

When the Chinese begin losing the war, U.S. forces target their strategic assets. A U.S. submarine sinks a Chinese ballistic missile submarine, causing the Chinese Politburo to panic and increase the readiness of their 12 land-based ICBMs. U.S. forces do not have the ability to destroy the silos, as they could only use deep-penetrating bombs, which had all been used to destroy Chinese bridges to disrupt the People's Liberation Army's (PLA) logistical support. This causes the U.S. and Russia to send a joint RAINBOW-Spetsnaz team to destroy the silos.

With the PLA's looming defeat in Siberia, which they were about to learn about via live UAV broadcasts from the CIA through the Internet, student demonstrators in Beijing raid a Politburo meeting, causing reformist minister Fang Gan to take control and arrest the war's perpetrators, making peace negotiations with the U.S. and Russia, and beginning China's transition to democracy.

The Campus
Following this, Ryan apparently completes his term and refuses to run for a second elected term. Robby Jackson thus campaigns to become the first African American President, but he is assassinated by the Ku Klux Klan on a trip to the South, enabling Kealty, his opponent, to become the next President by default. Before Ryan leaves office, he creates The Campus, a covert counter-terrorism organization that fronts as Hendley Associates, a financial trading firm. He also writes 100 presidential pardons for its members, with Attorney General Pat Martin's assistance.

Second Ryan administration
Dead or Alive (2010)
In his retirement, Ryan is living easy with a net worth of over $80 million. He is working on two versions of his memoirs, one for immediate release, and another detailing his CIA career to be published twenty years after his death. While he is at first publicly silent about his opinion on President Kealty's policies, he becomes increasingly frustrated with the direction in which he is taking the country. Ultimately, he announces that he will come out of retirement to run for a second full term as a Republican presidential candidate. Despite not being originally involved in the Campus' activities due to his high-profile status, he gradually becomes more directly linked to the Campus' operations, aiding them from behind the scenes on occasion. Here, Ryan learns his son, Jack Jr., is a field operative of the Campus, a fact which he reluctantly accepts.

Locked On (2011)
Ryan campaigns against Kealty, facing off against him in various televised debates. It becomes apparent that Ryan will win the election, as the majority of Americans had never entirely accepted Kealty. Despite the efforts of Paul Laska, a high-profile Czech billionaire and a devout enemy of Ryan, and key members of the Kealty administration who labelled Ryan's longtime friend John Clark a fugitive in an effort to expose the Campus (as well as tying Ryan to it by association), Ryan narrowly wins the election, overcoming all of Kealty's efforts to harm him.

Threat Vector (2012)
Soon after returning to the presidency, Ryan deals with a developing crisis in China, where President Wei Zhen Lin has declared his intentions to annex Hong Kong, Macau, and Taiwan and expand his country's territory into the South China Sea in a desperate attempt to recoup his country's economic losses. In reality, PLA Chairman Su Ke Qiang has been manipulating President Wei for his expansionist policies, secretly sanctioning cyber attacks on America's infrastructure that compromises the nation's national security apparatus. President Ryan decides to take action by supporting Taiwan, along with India, Vietnam, Indonesia, and the Philippines, which would also be affected by an expansion of China's territory.

The Campus later tracks down the nerve center of China's cyberattacks on the U.S. to an office building in Guangzhou. President Ryan orders the destruction of the building, decapitating China's cyberwarfare abilities. He makes contact with Wei and warns him that the cyber attacks are considered an act of war on China's part. After realizing that he has been used by Su for his own gain, Wei intentionally divulges information on Chairman Su's whereabouts, which Ryan interprets as a request from the Chinese president to assassinate the military leader. The Campus, with aid from a local rebel force and the FSB, later carry out a false flag attack on Chairman Su's motorcade outside Beijing. Ryan announces a blockade of China's oil supplies until the war effort is abandoned, calling upon Wei and the Politburo to accept defeat. A cornered Wei later commits suicide, eventually ending the conflict between the United States and China.

Command Authority (2013)

The Ryan administration then contends with newly-elected Russian president Valeri Volodin, who is a dedicated communist seeking to restore Russia to its former glory. Volodin had merged the SVR and the FSB into one entity to be led by enigmatic FSB head Roman Talanov, and later decides to invade Ukraine all the way to the capital of Kyiv. President Ryan sends American military forces to counter Russia's advance into Kyiv.

Ryan later finds out that Talanov is Zenith, a KGB assassin from the Cold War. Volodin had been his control officer, and together they had been employed by rogue elements within the KGB, who had an exit strategy in mind with the imminent fall of communism in the late 1980s by siphoning off billions of dollars from Soviet programs. Volodin then double-crossed his co-conspirators by ordering Talanov as Zenith to kill them all, as well as the bankers involved in order to prevent exposure to the rest of the KGB. In addition, Talanov was planted by his boss into Russian crime organization Seven Strong Men, rising in ranks to become its eventual leader and turning it into a tool for Volodin's policies. Ryan uses this information to blackmail the Russian president into stopping the Russian Army's advance into Kyiv. Talanov resigns and is later murdered.

Full Force and Effect (2014)
President Ryan deals with North Korean dictator Choi Ji-hoon, who attempts to start production at a rare earth mineral deposit found in their territory and then use the resulting billions of dollars in profit to purchase nuclear weapons technology. Choi decides to order the assassination of the American leader (with the aid of a Mexican drug cartel and an Arab bomb maker) in order to stop his persistent interference. During a state visit to Mexico City, Ryan barely survives the attempt on his life. The Campus later uncovers Choi's involvement in the incident, which leads to the dictator being deposed from power and later executed.

Commander in Chief (2015)
Ryan squares off with Volodin once again, as he observes that a series of seemingly isolated attacks in Europe correspond with an increase in Russia's oil profit. He tries to convince NATO, but they dispute his theory, fearing the consequences of an all-out war. Nevertheless, he sends the United States Navy to dispatch its Russian counterpart in the Baltic Sea. Volodin is later assassinated by the siloviki after his gambit of a covert violent offensive in an effort to recoup Russia's economic losses fails.

True Faith and Allegiance (2016)
President Ryan faces a crisis where American military and intelligence personnel are being targeted by ISIS. The specificity of the target packages make it clear that a massive intelligence breach has occurred. President Ryan finds himself pressured by the media and some of his government advisers to send troops into the Middle East to fight the Islamic State terrorists, but he resists and gathers more intelligence. The culprit was later revealed to be a Romanian hacker, who had obtained an old copy of a database containing personal information on military and intelligence personnel. After footage of terrorist attacks released by ISIS inspires a wave of copycat attacks in the United States, President Ryan orders the bombing of the headquarters of Islamic State's propaganda wing.

Ryan then appears in Point of Contact (2017) as he attends a funeral for his son Jack Junior's colleague in Hendley Associates, Paul Brown, who was revealed as a former CIA officer who had helped avert a North Korean plot to crash the Asian stock market.

Power and Empire (2017)
Ryan deals with the Chinese once again, as a series of seemingly unrelated attacks in Asia, Europe, and Africa show their involvement. The Campus later discovers that a secret cabal composed of hardliners within the Chinese government are plotting to depose current president Zhao Chengzhi for his moderate stance on several issues of importance. The cabal plans to make Zhao look reckless, provoking Ryan to invoke the Ryan Doctrine and have him killed. Jack Ryan Jr. later prevents an assassination attempt on his father and President Zhao in the G20 summit in Tokyo, and the conspirators are later arrested for treason.

Ryan briefly appears in the next released novel Line of Sight (2018), where he orders the destruction of a building in Bosnia containing stolen thermobaric warheads to be launched by Serb extremists on a Serbian Orthodox Church event nearby as a false flag attack to provoke war between NATO and the Russians in the Balkans.

Oath of Office (2018)
President Ryan is faced with a multitude of crises. A flu epidemic as well as spring floods occur in the southeast United States, and Ryan has to deal with his political rival, senator Michelle Chadwick, who has been attacking him using bot-planted fake news stories. He sends the Secret Service to protect her from imminent assassination, and an attempt by Russian foreign intelligence was thwarted. President Ryan later delivers a presidential address showing the dangers of fake news. Overseas, Ryan has to deal with Russia plotting to invade Ukraine yet again disguised as a military exercise, as well as the siege of the United States embassy in Cameroon by the Cameroonian government eager on arresting its opposition leader.

President Ryan expresses caution over a series of protests in Iran, favorably dubbed the Persian Spring. His suspicion was proven true when it was revealed that the leader of the dissidents, Reza Kazem, was a proxy made by the Iranian government on behalf of rogue elements in the Russian government, who have stolen nuclear weapons and are intent on launching them on American military bases in or near Iran. Kazem reneges on his deal and plots to launch the missiles into low Earth orbit, creating space junk that would destroy several satellites in its path. Ryan orders the destruction of the nuclear defense facility in Mashhad containing one of the missiles; the other is launched into space but fails to reach its destination at the last minute.

Ryan then appears in the next Jack Ryan Jr. novel Enemy Contact (2019). He deals with U.S. senator Deborah Dixon's stonewalling of his proposed foreign policy initiative, which includes building a U.S. military base in Poland to counter Russian aggression to the east. When it was revealed that Senator Dixon's son has unsavory connections to the Chinese, President Ryan blackmails her into passing an anticorruption bill.

Code of Honor (2019)
President Ryan receives a cryptic text message from his friend and former CIA colleague Father Pat West. He warns him of a next-generation AI program named Calliope, which could be used by the Chinese military to start a conflict with the United States. The Jesuit priest had been imprisoned by Indonesian police for trumped-up charges of blasphemy against Islam, when in fact he had earlier witnessed the murder of an American software engineer who first told him about Calliope.

The chief executive discreetly orders the Campus to investigate Father West's text. Then he calls on the Indonesian president to release his friend, to no avail. Undeterred, he makes a state visit to Indonesia, eventually informing the Indonesian president of China's sinister plans. Father West is eventually released from prison.

Ryan appears in the next Jack Ryan, Jr. novel Firing Point (2020). A series container ships mysteriously disappear across the Pacific Ocean, and President Ryan tries to pinpoint whoever is responsible.

Series overview
Novels
Jack Ryan has been featured in 21 novels which have been written by Tom Clancy, Mark Greaney, Mike Maden, and Marc Cameron. Clancy solely wrote most of the novels up to 2010, from which his next novels were co-written with Greaney and Grant Blackwood. After Clancy's death in 2013, Greaney and Cameron took over the character in their own respective contributions to the franchise; Maden briefly featured Ryan in his own entries in the spin-off Jack Ryan, Jr. series.

 The Hunt for Red October (1984)
 Patriot Games (1987)
 The Cardinal of the Kremlin (1988)
 Clear and Present Danger (1989)
 The Sum of All Fears (1991)
 Debt of Honor (1994)
 Executive Orders (1996)
 The Bear and the Dragon (2000)
 Red Rabbit (2002)
 The Teeth of the Tiger (2003)
 Dead or Alive (2010)
 Locked On (2011)
 Threat Vector (2012)
 Command Authority (2013)
 Support and Defend (2014)
 Full Force and Effect (2014)
 Under Fire (2015)
 Commander in Chief (2015)
 Duty and Honor (2016)
 True Faith and Allegiance (2016)
 Point of Contact (2017)
 Power and Empire (2017)
 Line of Sight (2018)
 Oath of Office (2018)
 Enemy Contact (2019)
 Code of Honor (2019)
 Firing Point (2020)
 Shadow of The Dragon (2020)
 Target Acquired (2021)
 Chain of Command (2021)
 Zero Hour (2022)
 Red Winter (2022)

Films

Five films based on Clancy novels featuring Jack Ryan have been produced.  The movie portraying the earliest incarnation of Ryan (fifth film chronologically) is titled Jack Ryan: Shadow Recruit and stars Chris Pine. Released on January 17, 2014, it follows Ryan's move from his accident in the Marines into his CIA career.  Jack Ryan is also portrayed by Alec Baldwin in the 1990 film The Hunt for Red October, Harrison Ford in Patriot Games (1992) and Clear and Present Danger (1994), and Ben Affleck in the 2002 film The Sum of All Fears.

In the novels, Patriot Games occurs before The Hunt for Red October, though the order was reversed in the film versions. Additionally, The Sum of All Fears is not part of Baldwin/Ford series, but rather an intended reboot of the franchise which departs significantly from the chronology of the novels. It takes place in 2002, whereas the novel takes place in 1991/1992. Jack Ryan: Shadow Recruit is a second reboot of the franchise and departs from all previous films.

 The Hunt for Red October (1990)
 Patriot Games (1992)
 Clear and Present Danger (1994)
 The Sum of All Fears (2002)
 Jack Ryan: Shadow Recruit (2014)

Television

It was announced by Deadline that Carlton Cuse and Graham Roland would be working with Michael Bay and his production company Platinum Dunes and Paramount Television on a Jack Ryan TV series for Amazon. On April 29, 2016, Deadline announced that John Krasinski would star as Jack Ryan in the series. On August 16, 2016, Amazon Studios announced they had given a series order for a 10-episode first season of Jack Ryan. On November 4, 2016, Abbie Cornish was cast as Cathy Muller in the series. On January 6, 2017, it was reported that Morten Tyldum would direct the pilot. In February 2017, it was announced that The Americans'' director Daniel Sackheim would direct multiple episodes and produce the series. The series premiered on August 31, 2018, and was said to be inspired by the Harrison Ford Jack Ryan films. Four months before its premiere, the series was renewed for a second season. On February 13, 2019, the series was renewed for a third season. A fourth (and final) season was announced on October 14, 2021.

Video games

Many video games based on the series have been made, some based on the novels, others on the films and spin-offs.

 The Hunt for Red October (1987)
 The Hunt for Red October (1990)
 The Sum of All Fears (2002)

See also

John Clark
List of fictional U.S. Presidents

References

Further reading

Ryanverse characters
Action film characters
Characters in American novels of the 20th century
Characters in American novels of the 21st century
Fictional accountants
Fictional Central Intelligence Agency personnel
Fictional characters from Baltimore
Fictional consultants
Fictional historians
Fictional intelligence analysts
Fictional military personnel in films
Fictional people in finance
Fictional presidents of the United States
Fictional professors
Fictional Republicans (United States)
Fictional United States independent politicians
Fictional United States Marine Corps personnel
Fictional United States National Security Advisors
Fictional vice presidents of the United States
Literary characters introduced in 1984
Spy film characters
Thriller film characters
Fictional people from the 20th-century